Maurice de Conninck (15 May 1897 – 5 October 1987) was a French middle-distance runner. He competed in the men's 1500 metres at the 1920 Summer Olympics.

References

External links
 

1897 births
1987 deaths
Athletes (track and field) at the 1920 Summer Olympics
Athletes (track and field) at the 1924 Summer Olympics
French male middle-distance runners
French male steeplechase runners
Olympic athletes of France
Place of birth missing